Trixodes is a genus of bristle flies in the family Tachinidae. There is at least one described species in Trixodes, T. obesus.

Distribution
Mexico

References

Dexiinae
Taxa named by Daniel William Coquillett
Tachinidae genera
Diptera of North America